Vincenzo Petagna (Naples, 17 January 1734 – 6 October 1810) was an Italian biologist, physician and entomologist. He was appointed as director of the small botanical garden pertaining to the Monastery of Santa Maria di Monte Oliveto (associated with the church now known as Sant'Anna dei Lombardi) in central Naples. He was also the teacher of Antonio Savaresi. The plant Petagnaea gussonei has been named after him.

Life 
Vincenzo Petagna was born in Naples on 17 January 1734; his father was Antonino Petagna, while his mother was Orsola Cuomo; his parents were described as "honest and fearful parents". As a boy, he first studied at the Jesuits, where he learned Latin. He later also studied philosophy and medicine and graduated in medicine at about the age of 20. Later, animated by interest in medicine, he followed a course of medicina-pratica taught by Luigi Visone.

In 1770, after he met the prince of Kaunitz, minister plenipotentiary of the court of Vienna in Naples, he traveled with him in Austria and he took the opportunity to visit also Germany and Western Italy. The trip allowed him to come into contact with important scholars from other countries and this, unlike other scholars of the Kingdom of Naples, granted him a greater notoriety abroad.

Back in Naples, he began to prepare his private collection of natural history, especially the section on insects. Then he had to go to Palermo in order to visit Marquis President Airoldi, and, once there, he took the chance to study Sicilian vegetation. Once back, he was assigned to teach botany at the Royal University of Naples, becoming professore interinale. Later, the position was confirmed, and he became a tenured professor. In his role as a professor, he was known for his kindness and courtesy towards students, and he managed successfully to teach them the properties of medicinal herbs.

In the preface of his work - Institutiones Botanicae - Petagna stated that he had learnt a lot inside the botanical garden of Pietro Sanseverino (a nobleman of Chiaromonte), and that he had been assisted by his talented assistant Giulio Candida.

He was a member of the Royal Institute of Encouragement to Natural Sciences of Naples and of many other academies. He was also a member of the Real Deputation of Health.

His only wish, according to the sources, was to have a sufficiently large botanical garden, but he was barely allowed to have a small one in the center of the previous Monastery of Monteoliveto, Naples . He died on 6 October 1810, perhaps in Naples. According to the sources, he was also a devoted Catholic.

Works

Works by Petagna's pupil Giulio Candida

Bibliography

References

External links
 Delle facultà delle piante - Web site of the Botanic garden of the University of Naples

1734 births
1810 deaths
18th-century Italian botanists
Italian zoologists
Italian entomologists
Italian carcinologists
Physicians from Naples